Agnorhiza is a small genus of flowering plants in the family Asteraceae described as a genus in 1998. Its species had previously been considered members of either Wyethia or  Balsamorhiza. The plants are native to California, with the range of one species (A. ovata) extending into northern Mexico. They are perennial herbs with sunflower-like flower heads 1 to 4 centimeters wide.

 Species
 Agnorhiza bolanderi - Bolander's mule's ears
 Agnorhiza elata - Hall's mule's ears
 Agnorhiza invenusta - Coville's mule's ears
 Agnorhiza ovata - southern mule's ears
 Agnorhiza reticulata - El Dorado mule's ears

References

External links
 USDA Plants Profile for Agnorhiza

Heliantheae
Flora of California
Asteraceae genera
Taxa named by Willis Linn Jepson